My Phone was an online service with a companion mobile client application from Microsoft. The service, which launched on October 6, 2009, provided a free mobile phone back-up solution by wirelessly synchronizing contacts, calendar appointments, tasks, text messages, browser favorites, photos, music, video and documents with a password-protected online portal where users could access and manage their information. The service also enabled photo sharing and, in some markets, a set of features for dealing with a lost phone that were sold as a Premium Package requiring a one-time fee. My Phone supported Windows Mobile OS versions 6.0, 6.1 and 6.5 and was available globally in 25 languages. The service used Windows Live ID for authentication and the Windows Live server infrastructure for storing user information. On June 8, 2011, Microsoft announced that My Phone would be discontinued with sync from phones ending on August 7, 2011 and website access to data ending on October 6, 2011. Data (contacts, calendar entries, text messages, and photos) was moved to SkyDrive (which has since been rebranded as OneDrive).

My Phone Beta 
Microsoft announced and launched the beta version of My Phone at Mobile World Congress on February 16, 2009. Approximately 200,000 users in 200 countries beta tested the service scalability and features.

My Phone Free Features 
The service offered the following free features:

My Phone Premium Feature Package 
My Phone offers a set of premium features in the event of a lost phone. These features include:

  
The premium features are available to users of the free service on an as-needed basis. They are sold as a package requiring a one-time fee of $4.99 in the US. The package is meant to be activated from the My Phone portal after the phone has been lost or stolen as long as the device is turned on and has connectivity. The package includes 7-day access to (3) Ring, (3) Map, (1) Lock, and (1) Erase.

The Premium Package was initially free of charge, to trial; since December 2009 the package is supplied with one free activation to be used at any time.

The Premium Package is available in the United States, Canada, Mexico, United Kingdom, Germany, France, Italy, Spain, Portugal, Denmark, Netherlands, Greece, Poland, Finland, Norway, Sweden, Brazil, Australia, Japan, Singapore and Taiwan.

See also
Your Phone

References

External links
 My Phone web portal

Microsoft cloud services
Cloud applications
Windows Mobile
Computer-related introductions in 2009
Products and services discontinued in 2011